Cops & Robbersons is a 1994 American crime comedy film directed by Michael Ritchie, and starring Chevy Chase, Jack Palance, Dianne Wiest, and Robert Davi.

Plot

When the police discover that a mob hitman has moved in next door to the Robbersons, they want to find out what he is up to. So they set up a stakeout in the Robbersons' home. Hard-nosed, tough-as-nails Jake Stone and his young partner Tony Moore are assigned to the stakeout, but now it is a question of whether Jake can last long enough to capture the bad guys. The Robbersons want to help, and by doing so they drive Jake crazy.

Cast
 Chevy Chase as Norman Robberson 
 Jack Palance as Detective Jake Stone 
 Dianne Wiest as Helen Robberson 
 Robert Davi as Horace Osborn 
 David Barry Gray as Detective Tony Moore 
 Jason James Richter as Kevin Robberson 
 Fay Masterson as Cindy Robberson 
 Miko Hughes as Billy Robberson 
 Richard Romanus as Fred Lutz 
 Sal Landi as Jerry Callahan
 Jack Kehler as Caniff
 M. Emmet Walsh as Captain Ted Corbett (uncredited)

Production
The script for Cops & Robbersons was written on spec by Bernie Somers which Channel Productions purchased in August of 1992.

Reception
Cops & Robbersons received generally negative reviews. On Rotten Tomatoes, it has an approval rating of 14% based on 21 reviews, with an average rating of 3.4/10.

Roger Ebert gave the film 2 out of 4 stars, referring to it as "one more variation on the FOW movie, so called because the plot involves a Fish Out of the Water". He singled out a scene in which Chase's character smuggles police officers into his home and snatches a cat from his wife, commenting: 

Commented Richard Harrington of The Washington Post: 

Chris Hicks of the Deseret News opined that "Norman is the most ridiculous sitcom husband and father to grace the big screen since . . . well, since Clark Griswold, of the "National Lampoon's Vacation" pictures. And since both Norman and Clark are played by Chevy Chase, why not? They're both dumb and clumsy and have dysfunctional families, and they both pretend that everything's OK. But where the "Vacation" pictures had some satiric bite to offset the silliness—well, the first one did—"Cops and Robbersons" is just stupid. Loaded with ill-timed pratfalls and dopey physical shtick, it's movies like this that give slapstick a bad name."

Janet Maslin of The New York Times lamented that the film was "even more unfunny than his disastrous talk show", calling it "a Chase vehicle with four flat tires"

Year-end lists
 Top 10 worst (listed alphabetically, not ranked) – Mike Mayo, The Roanoke Times

Box office
The film debuted poorly at the box office, earning $3.7 million and coming in second place behind Four Weddings and a Funeral. The film grossed just $11,391,093 in the domestic box office from an unknown budget.

References

External links

 
 
 

1994 films
1990s buddy comedy films
American buddy comedy films
American buddy cop films
Films directed by Michael Ritchie
1990s police comedy films
TriStar Pictures films
Films scored by William Ross
1990s buddy cop films
1994 comedy films
1990s English-language films
1990s American films